Bhaiwala is a village in Faisalabad, Pakistan. It is also officially known as 202 R.b Bhaiwala.

Bhaiwala is one of the most developed villages in Faisalabad and has a population of nearly 40,000.
It was known as talagarh before its name was changed to Bhaiwala
The neighboring villages of Bhai Wala are Ghona, Gatti, Chak Jhumra. 

Some people think that Gatti and bhaiwala are two different places but administratively both are one called 202 R.b Bhaiwala or simple Bhaiwala.

Notable people
Mahmud Ahmed belonged to Bhaiwala

References

Villages in Faisalabad District